Birket El Sabaa is a city in the Monufia Governorate, Egypt.

See also

 List of cities and towns in Egypt

References

Populated places in Monufia Governorate